Protokylol (Ventaire) is a β-adrenergic receptor agonist used as a bronchodilator in Europe and the United States.

It is methylenedioxyphenyl-isoproterenol.

The Para-Methoxyamphetamine (PMA) analog is twice the potency as the tenamfetamine analog.

References

External links 
 

Benzodioxoles
Catechols
Phenylethanolamines
Substituted amphetamines